Anouer Taouerghi (born ) is a Tunisian male volleyball player. He is part of the Tunisia men's national volleyball team. He competed with the national team at the 2012 Summer Olympics in London, Great Britain. He played with CS Sfaxien in 2012 and competed with the club at the 2013 FIVB Volleyball Men's Club World Championship.

Clubs
  CS Sfaxien (2012–2013)

See also
 Tunisia at the 2012 Summer Olympics

References

External links
 Profile at FIVB.org

1983 births
Living people
Tunisian men's volleyball players
Place of birth missing (living people)
Volleyball players at the 2012 Summer Olympics
Olympic volleyball players of Tunisia
Mediterranean Games silver medalists for Tunisia
Mediterranean Games medalists in volleyball
Competitors at the 2013 Mediterranean Games